Invisible Design II is the sixteenth solo album by American composer Bill Laswell, released on March 24, 2009 by Tzadik Records.

Track listing

Personnel 
Adapted from the Invisible Design II liner notes.
Musicians
Bill Laswell – fretless bass guitar, eight-string bass guitar, effects
Technical personnel
Heung-Heung Chin – design
James Dellatacoma – assistant engineer
Scott Hull – mastering
Robert Musso – recording
John Zorn – producer

Release history

References

External links 
 Invisible Design II at Discogs (list of releases)

2009 albums
Bill Laswell albums
Albums produced by John Zorn
Tzadik Records albums